Arjanit Krasniqi (born 16 October 1999) is a footballer who plays as a midfielder for National League South club Chelmsford City. Born in London, he has represented Kosovo at youth age levels.

Club career
Born in England, Krasniqi started his playing career with Waltham Forest during the 2017–18 campaign, before sealing a move to EFL club Colchester United in January 2018. After just less than 18 months at the Essex-based side, Krasniqi was released at the end of his contract in June 2019.

Following his release from Colchester, Krasniqi enjoyed a brief spell at fellow Essex team Billericay Town, before signing a two-year deal with Finnish side SJK in February 2020. Later that month, he made his debut during a 1–0 defeat against KuPS in a Finnish Cup tie, replacing fellow Kosovan Anel Rashkaj with ten minutes remaining. On 7 September 2020, Krasniqi's contract was terminated following his desire to return to his native England.

Following his return to England, Krasniqi joined up with National League South side Braintree Town in October 2020, and made his debut during a 4–3 home defeat to Hemel Hempstead Town. He made 35 appearances for the Iron, scoring seven goals.

In January 2022, Krasniqi signed for Dover Athletic on a non-contract basis. Krasniqi signed a contract with the club following relegation at the end of the 2021–22 season. On 28 December 2022, Krasniqi departed the club having had his contract terminated by mutual consent.

On 31 December 2022, Krasniqi signed for Chelmsford City.

International career
Krasniqi has represented Kosovo at under-19 and under-21 levels.

Career statistics

References

External links

1999 births
Living people
Kosovan footballers
Kosovo youth international footballers
English footballers
Association football midfielders
Walthamstow F.C. players
Colchester United F.C. players
Billericay Town F.C. players
Seinäjoen Jalkapallokerho players
SJK Akatemia players
Braintree Town F.C. players
Dover Athletic F.C. players
Chelmsford City F.C. players
English people of Kosovan descent
Expatriate footballers in Finland
National League (English football) players
Ykkönen players
Footballers from Westminster
English expatriate sportspeople in Finland
Kosovan expatriate sportspeople in Finland
English expatriate footballers
Kosovan expatriate footballers